The Ferrymead Two Foot Railway Society Inc. is a member society of Ferrymead Heritage Park, in Heathcote, Christchurch, New Zealand. The society operates the  narrow gauge Ferrymead Two Foot Railway on a 450 m long circuit of track at the park, adjacent to the Moorhouse railway station. Trains are operated during special events or on major operating days using two small carriages built on ex-tipping wagon chassis.

Locomotives
The railway has two F. C. Hibberd & Co. "Planet" diesel-mechanical locomotives, built in 1953. Both were originally imported by Dominion Salt Ltd for use at its Lake Grassmere salt works in Marlborough; following the construction of a conveyor belt system to replace the railway in 1964 both locomotives were placed in open-air storage at Lake Grassmere before moving to Ferrymead in 1967.

Of the two locomotives, Planet No. 3483 George is undergoing restoration to working order at Ferrymead. Planet No. 3484 Winifred has been restored to working order and has been the regular operational locomotive on the group's line since 2007. Both locomotives were named after members of the Skellerup family who originally owned the salt works, Winifred being named after the late Winifred Skellerup while George is named after George Skellerup, Winifred's father and the original owner of Dominion Salt.

Rolling stock
The Society owns a small fleet of wagons, mostly obtained from coal mines on the West Coast of the South Island. The majority of these are coal tubs, although there are a small number of wagons built for maintenance purposes underground. The society also owns a small number of side-tipping wagons formerly used by Dominion Salt at Lake Grassmere.

A further two side-tipping wagons were rebuilt as passenger carriages at Ferrymead in the lead-up to the inauguration of passenger services in 2007. One carriage was built as an eight-seat open carriage, while the other was built as a six-seat closed carriage. The Society also owns a bogie carriage, formerly used as a first class carriage on the 'free railway service' run by the Colonial Sugar Mills in Fiji, which is currently under restoration.

Other equipment
The Society owns a small hand crane which is fitted on a homemade chassis. It is intended to place the crane on static display in the future once it has been restored and made inoperable for safety reasons.

References

External links
 Ferrymead Heritage Park home page
 Light Rail in Heathcote 
 Ferrymead's Grassmere Salt Wagons article 
 Ferrymead 2 Foot Railway (slightly outdated)
 Some photos of the Railway

Rail transport in Christchurch
Heritage railways in New Zealand
2 ft gauge railways in New Zealand
Ferrymead Heritage Park